Patrick Weah (born 15 December 2003) is a Liberian professional footballer who plays as a forward for Major League Soccer club Minnesota United.

Club career
Born in Monrovia, Liberia, Weah moved with his parents to Maple Grove, Minnesota, where he played high school soccer at Wayzata High School. While at Wayzata, Weah was part of the side that ended as the state runners-up before helping his school win the state championship during his sophomore season. At the end of his championship season, Weah was named as the Minnesota State Player of the Year. Following his two seasons with this school team, Weah joined the youth academy at Minnesota United.

In June 2020, it was announced that Weah would play college soccer with the Saint Louis Billikens. He made his collegiate debut for the Billikens on 3 February 2021 against the Kansas City Roos, scoring in the 53rd minute of a 3–0 victory.

Minnesota United
On 4 March 2021, Weah returned to Major League Soccer club Minnesota United and signed as a homegrown player. He made his professional debut for the club on 1 May 2021 against Austin FC, coming on as an 81st-minute substitute during the 0–1 defeat.

Sacramento Republic FC
On 17 September 2021, USL Championship club Sacramento Republic announced they have acquired Weah on loan from Minnesota United for the remainder of the 2021 season.

International career
On 2 October 2021, he accepted a call-up from Liberia for two World Cup qualifiers against Cape Verde.

Career statistics

Honors
Individual
2017 Minnesota State Player of the Year

References

External links
 Profile at Minnesota United

2003 births
Living people
People from Maple Grove, Minnesota
Liberian footballers
Association football forwards
Saint Louis Billikens men's soccer players
Minnesota United FC players
Major League Soccer players
Soccer players from Minnesota
Sacramento Republic FC players
Sportspeople from the Minneapolis–Saint Paul metropolitan area